St Andrew's Church (also known as St Andrew's and St Stephen's Church) is a former church building located in Perth, Perth and Kinross, Scotland. Standing at 19 Atholl Street, one block east of St Ninian's Cathedral, it was completed in 1885 by Robert Brand and Sons builders, the work of Andrew Heiton and his nephew Andrew Granger Heiton. It is now a Category C listed building.

See also

List of listed buildings in Perth, Scotland

References 

Category C listed buildings in Perth and Kinross
Listed churches in Scotland
Andrew's, Saint
1885 establishments in Scotland
Listed buildings in Perth, Scotland